Salih Özcan (born 11 January 1998) is a professional footballer who plays as a midfielder for Bundesliga club Borussia Dortmund. Born in Germany, he plays for the Turkish national team.

Club career
Born in Germany, Özcan is of Turkish descent as he was born into a Turkish family. Özcan spent the majority of his youth career in 1. FC Köln's youth system. He first featured in 1. FC Köln's first team in September 2016 in a match against Schalke 04. During the 2017–18 season he consistently started in central midfield. He scored his first league goal on 2 September 2018 in a match against FC St. Pauli.

In 2017, Özcan was awarded the golden Fritz Walter Medal for the best U19 player in Germany.

On 23 August 2019, Özcan joined Holstein Kiel on loan until the end of 2019–20 season.

On 29 June 2021, in spite of speculations about a possible transfer, the club announced that Özcan had signed a new two-year contract with Köln.

On 23 May 2022, it was reported that Özcan would join Borussia Dortmund for the 2022–23 season and that he would sign a contract with the club until 2026. The German sports magazine kicker estimated the transfer fee to be €5 million.

International career
Özcan was eligible for both the Turkish and German national teams, played for Germany's youth teams.

On 25 March 2022, Özcan was called up to the Turkey national team by head coach Stefan Kuntz. He debuted in a friendly 3–2 loss to Italy on 29 March 2022.

Honours

Germany U21
UEFA European Under-21 Championship: 2021

Individual
 Fritz Walter Medal U19 Gold: 2017
 kicker Bundesliga Team of the Season: 2021–22

References

External links
Profile at the Borussia Dortmund website

1998 births
Living people
Footballers from Cologne
Turkish footballers
Turkey international footballers
German footballers
Germany under-21 international footballers
Germany youth international footballers
German people of Turkish descent
Citizens of Turkey through descent
Association football midfielders
1. FC Köln II players
1. FC Köln players
Holstein Kiel players
Borussia Dortmund players
Bundesliga players
Regionalliga players
2. Bundesliga players